Bonsecours Market, at 350 rue Saint-Paul in Old Montreal, is a two-story domed public market. For more than 100 years, it was the main public market in the Montreal area. It also briefly accommodated the Parliament of United Canada for one session in 1849.

Named for the adjacent Notre-Dame-de-Bon-Secours Chapel, it opened in 1847. During 1849 the building was used for the Legislative Assembly of the Province of Canada.  The market's design was influenced by Dublin's Customs House.

History

Construction of this Neoclassical building began in 1844 and were completed in 1847. It was designed by British architect William Footner, and alterations completed in 1860 were designed by Irish-born Montreal architect George Browne (1811–1885). Bonsecours Market also housed Montreal City Hall between 1852 and 1878. The former city hall chambers later became a 3700-square-meter meeting room.

The market building was also a venue for banquets, exhibitions and other festivals. Browne was charged with adding a 900-square-meter concert hall and banquet hall.

The building continued to house the farmer's central market, an increasingly multicultural mix of small vendors, until it was closed in 1963 and slated for demolition. However, the building was later transformed into a multi-purpose facility, with a mall that houses outdoor cafés, restaurants and boutiques on the main and second floors, as well as a rental hall and banquet rooms on the lower and upper floors and municipal office space.

Bonsecours Market was designated a National Historic Site of Canada in 1984.

Legacy

On 28 May 1990 Canada Post issued 'Bonsecours Market, Montreal' designed by Raymond Bellemare. The stamp features an image of the Bonsecours Market, which was designed by Montreal architect William Footner and constructed from 1842-45. The $5 stamps are perforated 13.5 and were printed by British American Bank Note Company & Canadian Bank Note Company, Limited.

References

External links
 Bonsecours Market. Gobernment of Quebec website
 A View on Cities: Bonsecours Market 

1847 establishments in Canada
Old Montreal
City and town halls in Quebec
Commercial buildings completed in 1860
Landmarks in Montreal
Legislative buildings in Canada
National Historic Sites in Quebec
Neoclassical architecture in Canada
Domes
Province of Canada
Retail markets in Canada
Shopping malls in Montreal